The little grebe (Tachybaptus ruficollis), also known as dabchick, is a member of the grebe family of water birds. The genus name is from Ancient Greek takhus "fast" and bapto "to sink under". The specific ruficollis is from Latin rufus "red" and Modern Latin -collis, "-necked", itself derived from Latin collum "neck".

At  in length it is the smallest European member of its family. It is commonly found in open bodies of water across most of its range.

Taxonomy
The little grebe was described by the German naturalist Peter Simon Pallas in 1764 and given the binomial name Colymbus ruficollis. The tricolored grebe was considered conspecific, with some taxonomic authorities still considering it so. 

There are six currently-recognized subspecies, separated principally by size and colouration.
 T. r. ruficollis – (Pallas, 1764): nominate, found from Europe and western Russia south to North Africa
 T. r. iraquensis – (Ticehurst, 1923): found in southeastern Iraq and southwestern Iran
 T. r. capensis – (Salvadori, 1884): found in Sub-Saharan Africa, Madagascar, Sri Lanka, and the Indian subcontinent, extending east to Burma
 T. r. poggei – (Reichenow, 1902): found from southeastern to northeastern Asia, Hainan, Taiwan, Japan, and south Kuril Islands
 T. r. philippensis – (Bonnaterre, 1790): found in the northern Philippines
 T. r. cotabato – (Rand, 1948): found on Mindanao

Description
The little grebe is a small water bird with a pointed bill. The adult is unmistakable in summer, predominantly dark above with its rich, rufous colour neck, cheeks and flanks, and bright yellow gape. The rufous is replaced by a dirty brownish grey in non-breeding and juvenile birds.

Juvenile birds have a yellow bill with a small black tip, and black and white streaks on the cheeks and sides of the neck as seen below. This yellow bill darkens as the juveniles age, eventually turning black in adulthood.

In winter, its size, buff plumage, with a darker back and cap, and “powder puff” rear end enable easy identification of this species. The little grebe's breeding call, given singly or in duet, is a trilled repeated weet-weet-weet or wee-wee-wee which sounds like a horse whinnying.

Distribution
This bird breeds in small colonies in heavily vegetated areas of freshwater lakes across Europe, much of Asia down to New Guinea, and most of Africa. Most birds move to more open or coastal waters in winter, but it is only migratory in those parts of its range where the waters freeze. Outside of breeding season, it moves into more open water, occasionally even appearing on the coast in small bays.

Behaviour
The little grebe is an excellent swimmer and diver and pursues its fish and aquatic invertebrate prey underwater. It uses the vegetation skilfully as a hiding place.

Like all grebes, it nests at the water's edge, since its legs are set very far back and it cannot walk well. Usually four to seven eggs are laid. When the adult bird leaves the nest it usually takes care to cover the eggs with weeds. This makes it less likely to be detected by predators. The young leave the nest and can swim soon after hatching, and chicks are often carried on the backs of the swimming adults. In India, the species breeds during the rainy season.

Gallery

References

External links

 BTO BirdFacts - Little Grebe
 Grebes of the World by André Konter
 Information and Illustration on Little Grebe from A Field Guide to Birds of Armenia
 
 
 
 
 

little grebe
Birds of Africa
Birds of Eurasia
Birds of Japan
little grebe
Taxa named by Peter Simon Pallas
Birds of Nepal